The Third Battle of Ypres, also known as the Battle of Passchendaele, was a campaign of the First World War, fought by the Allies against the German Empire. The battle took place on the Western Front, from July to November 1917, for control of the ridges south and east of the Belgian city of Ypres in West Flanders, as part of a strategy decided by the Allies at conferences in November 1916 and May 1917. Passchendaele lies on the last ridge east of Ypres,  from Roulers (now Roeselare), a junction of the Bruges-(Brugge)-to-Kortrijk railway. The station at Roulers was on the main supply route of the German 4th Army. Once Passchendaele Ridge had been captured, the Allied advance was to continue to a line from Thourout (now Torhout) to Couckelaere (Koekelare).

Further operations and a British supporting attack along the Belgian coast from Nieuport (Nieuwpoort), combined with an amphibious landing (Operation Hush), were to have reached Bruges and then the Dutch frontier. Although a general withdrawal had seemed inevitable in early October, the Germans were able to avoid one due to the resistance of the 4th Army, unusually wet weather in August, the beginning of the autumn rains in October and the diversion of British and French resources to Italy. The campaign ended in November, when the Canadian Corps captured Passchendaele, apart from local attacks in December and early in the new year. The Battle of the Lys (Fourth Battle of Ypres) and the Fifth Battle of Ypres of 1918, were fought before the Allies occupied the Belgian coast and reached the Dutch frontier.

A campaign in Flanders was controversial in 1917 and has remained so. The British Prime Minister, David Lloyd George, opposed the offensive, as did General Ferdinand Foch, the Chief of Staff of the French Army. Field Marshal Sir Douglas Haig, commander of the British Expeditionary Force (BEF), did not receive approval for the Flanders operation from the War Cabinet until 25 July. Matters of dispute by the participants, writers and historians since 1917 include the wisdom of pursuing an offensive strategy in the wake of the Nivelle Offensive, rather than waiting for the arrival of the American Expeditionary Force (AEF) in France.

Remaining controversial are the choice of Flanders, its climate, the selection of General Hubert Gough and the Fifth Army to conduct the offensive, and debates over the nature of the opening attack and between advocates of shallow and deeper objectives. Also debated are the time between the Battle of Messines  and the first Allied attack (the Battle of Pilckem Ridge, 31 July), the extent to which the French Army mutinies influenced the British, the effect of the exceptional weather, the decision to continue the offensive in October and the human costs of the campaign.

Background

Flanders

1914

Belgium had been recognised in the Treaty of London (1839) as a sovereign and neutral state after the secession of the southern provinces of the Netherlands in 1830. The German invasion of Belgium on 4 August 1914, in violation of Article VII of the treaty, was the British  against Germany. British military operations in Belgium began with the arrival of the British Expeditionary Force (BEF) at Mons on 22 August. Operations in Flanders began during the Race to the Sea, reciprocal attempts by the French and German armies to turn their opponents' northern flank, through Picardy, Artois and Flanders. On 16 October, the Belgians and some French reinforcements began the defence of western Belgium and the French Channel ports, at the Battle of the Yser. When the German offensive failed, Falkenhayn ordered the capture of Ypres to gain a local advantage. By 18 November, the First Battle of Ypres had also ended in failure, at a cost of  casualties. In December, the British Admiralty began discussions with the War Office, for a combined operation to re-occupy the Belgian coast but were obliged to conform to French strategy and participate in offensives further south.

1915

Large British offensive operations in Flanders were not possible in 1915, due to a lack of resources. The Germans conducted their own Flanders offensive at the Second Battle of Ypres (22 April – 15 May 1915), making the Ypres salient more costly to defend. Sir Douglas Haig succeeded Sir John French as Commander-in-Chief of the BEF on 19 December. A week after his appointment, Haig met Vice-Admiral Sir Reginald Bacon, who emphasised the importance of obtaining control of the Belgian coast, to end the threat posed by German U-boats. Haig was sceptical of a coastal operation, believing that a landing from the sea would be far more difficult than anticipated and that an advance along the coast would require so much preparation, that the Germans would have ample warning. Haig preferred an advance from Ypres, to bypass the flooded area around the Yser and the coast, before attempting a coastal attack to clear the coast to the Dutch border.

1916

Minor operations took place in the Ypres salient in 1916, some being German initiatives to distract the Allies from the preparations for the offensive at Verdun and later attempts to divert Allied resources from the Battle of the Somme. Other operations were begun by the British to regain territory or to evict the Germans from ground overlooking their positions. Engagements took place on 12 February at Boesinghe and on 14 February at Hooge and Sanctuary Wood. There was much trench mortaring, mining and raiding by both sides and from January to May, the Second Army had  In May, reinforcements began arriving in Flanders from the south; the II Corps headquarters and  had arrived by the end of the month.

In January 1916, Plumer began to plan offensives against Messines Ridge, Lille and Houthulst Forest. General Henry Rawlinson was also ordered to plan an attack from the Ypres Salient on 4 February; planning continued but the Battle of Verdun and the Battle of the Somme took up the rest of the year. In November, Haig, the French commander-in-chief Joseph Joffre and the other Allies met at Chantilly. The commanders agreed on a strategy of simultaneous attacks, to overwhelm the Central Powers on the Western, Eastern and Italian fronts, by the first fortnight of February 1917. A meeting in London of the Admiralty and the General Staff urged that the Flanders operation be undertaken in 1917 and Joffre replied on 8 December, agreeing to a Flanders campaign after the spring offensive. The plan for a year of attrition offensives on the Western Front, with the main effort to be made in the summer by the BEF, was scrapped by the new French Commander-in-Chief Robert Nivelle in favour of a return to a strategy of decisive battle.

Allied strategy

Nivelle planned preliminary offensives to pin German reserves by the British at Arras and the French between the Somme and the Oise, then a French breakthrough offensive on the Aisne, followed by pursuit and exploitation. Haig had reservations and on 6 January Nivelle agreed to a proviso that if the first two parts of the operation failed to lead to a breakthrough, the operations would be stopped and the British could move their forces north for the Flanders offensive, which was of great importance to the British government. On 23 January, Haig wrote that it would take six weeks to move British troops and equipment to Flanders and on 14 March, noted that the Messines Ridge operation could begin in May. On 21 March, he wrote to Nivelle that it would take two months to prepare the offensive from Messines to Steenstraat but that the Messines operation could be ready in five or six weeks. The main French attack took place from 9 April to 9 May and failed to achieve a breakthrough. On 16 May, Haig wrote that he had divided the Flanders operation into two parts, one to take Messines Ridge and the main attack several weeks later. British determination to clear the Belgian coast took on more urgency after the Germans resumed unrestricted submarine warfare on 1 February 1917. On 1 May 1917, Haig wrote that the Nivelle Offensive had weakened the German army but that an attempt at a decisive blow would be premature. The wearing-out process would continue on a front where the Germans had no room to retreat. Even limited success would improve the tactical situation in the Ypres salient, reducing the exceptional wastage, even in quiet periods. In early May, Haig set the date for the Flanders offensive, the attack on Messines Ridge to begin on 7 June.

Kerensky offensive

The Russian army conducted the Kerensky Offensive in Galicia, to honour the agreement struck with the Allies at the Chantilly meeting of 15 to 16 November 1916. After a brief period of success from 1 to 19 July, the Russian offensive was contained by the German and Austro-Hungarian armies, which counter-attacked and forced the Russian armies to retreat. On the Baltic coast from 1 to 5 September 1917, the Germans attacked with their strategic reserve of six divisions and captured Riga. In Operation Albion (September–October 1917), the Germans took the islands at the mouth of the Gulf of Riga. Haig wished to exploit the diversion of German forces in Russia for as long as it continued and urged the British War Cabinet to commit the maximum amount of manpower and munitions to the battle in Flanders.

Prelude

Ypres salient

Ypres is overlooked by Kemmel Hill in the south-west and from the east by a line of low hills running south-west to north-east. Wytschaete (Wijtschate) and Hill 60 are to the east of Verbrandenmolen, Hooge, Polygon Wood and Passchendaele (Passendale). The rises are slight, apart from the vicinity of Zonnebeke, which has a gradient of  From Hooge and further east, the slope is  near Hollebeke, it is  heights are subtle and resemble a saucer lip around the city. Further south, is the muddy valley of the River Douve, Ploegsteert Wood (Plugstreet to the British) and Hill 63. West of Messines Ridge is the parallel Wulverghem (Spanbroekmolen) Spur and on the east side, the Oosttaverne Spur, which is also parallel to the main ridge. The general aspect south and east of Ypres, is one of low ridges and dips, gradually flattening northwards beyond Passchendaele, into a featureless plain.

Possession of the higher ground to the south and east of Ypres, gives an army ample scope for ground observation, enfilade fire and converging artillery bombardments. An occupier also has the advantage that artillery deployments and the movement of reinforcements, supplies and stores can be screened from view. The ridge had woods from Wytschaete to Zonnebeke giving good cover, some being of notable size, like Polygon Wood and those later named Battle Wood, Shrewsbury Forest and Sanctuary Wood. The main road to Ypres from Poperinge to Vlamertinge is in a defile, easily observed from the ridge. Roads in the area were unpaved, except for the main ones from Ypres, with occasional villages and houses dotted along them. The lowland west of the ridge was a mixture of meadows and fields, with high hedgerows dotted with trees, cut by streams and a network of drainage ditches emptying into canals.

Topography 

In Flanders, sands, gravels and marls predominate, covered by silts in places. The coastal strip is sandy but a short way into the hinterland, the ground rises towards the Vale of Ypres, which before 1914 was a flourishing market garden.

Underneath the soil is London clay, sand and silt; according to the Commonwealth War Graves Commission categories of sand, sandy soils and well-balanced soils, Messines ridge is well-balanced soil and the ground around Ypres is sandy soil. The ground is drained by many streams, canals and ditches, which need regular maintenance. Since 1914 much of the drainage had been destroyed, though some parts were restored by land drainage companies from England. The British considered the area drier than Loos, Givenchy and Plugstreet Wood further south. A study of weather data recorded at Lille,  from Ypres from  published in 1989, showed that August was more often dry than wet, that there was a trend towards dry autumns (September–November) and that average rainfall in October had decreased since the 1860s.

British plans

Preparations for operations in Flanders began in 1915, with the doubling of the Hazebrouck–Ypres rail line and the building of a new line from Bergues to Proven, which was doubled in early 1917. Progress on roads, rail lines, railheads and spurs in the Second Army zone was continuous and by mid-1917, gave the area the most efficient supply system of the BEF. Several plans and memoranda for a Flanders offensive were produced between January 1916 and May 1917, in which the writers tried to relate the offensive resources available to the terrain and the likely German defence. In early 1916, the importance of the capture of the Gheluvelt plateau for an advance further north was emphasised by Haig and the army commanders. On 14 February 1917, Colonel Norman MacMullen of GHQ proposed that the plateau be taken by a massed tank attack, reducing the need for artillery; in April a reconnaissance by Captain Giffard LeQuesne Martel found that the area was unsuitable for tanks.

On 9 February, Rawlinson, commander of the Fourth Army, suggested that Messines Ridge could be taken in one day and that the capture of the Gheluvelt plateau should be fundamental to the attack further north. He suggested that the southern attack from St Yves to Mont Sorrel should come first and that Mont Sorrel to Steenstraat should be attacked within  After discussions with Rawlinson and Plumer and the incorporation of Haig's changes, Macmullen submitted his memorandum on 14 February. With amendments the memorandum became the GHQ 1917 plan. A week after the Battle of Messines Ridge, Haig gave his objectives to his army commanders, the wearing out of the enemy, securing the Belgian coast and connecting with the Dutch frontier by capturing Passchendaele ridge, followed by an advance on Roulers and Operation Hush, an attack along the coast with a combined amphibious landing. If manpower and artillery were insufficient, only the first part of the plan might be fulfilled. On 30 April, Haig told Gough, the Fifth Army commander, that he would lead the Northern Operation and the coastal force, although Cabinet approval for the offensive was not granted until 21 June.

German defences

Group Dixmude held  with four front divisions and two  divisions, Group Ypres held  from Pilckem to Menin Road with three front divisions and two  divisions and Group  held a similar length of front south of the Menin road, with three front divisions and three  divisions. The  divisions were stationed behind the Menin and Passchendaele ridges. About  further back, were four more  divisions and  beyond them, another two in OHL reserve.

The Germans were anxious that the British would attempt to exploit the victory of the Battle of Messines, with an advance to the Tower Hamlets spur beyond the north end of Messines Ridge. On 9 June, Crown Prince Rupprecht proposed a withdrawal to the  line east of Messines. Construction of defences began but was terminated after Fritz von Loßberg was appointed Chief of Staff of the 4th Army. Loßberg rejected the proposed withdrawal to the  line and ordered that the front line east of the Oosttaverne line be held rigidly. The  (Flanders Position) along Passchendaele Ridge, in front of the  line, would become  and a new position, would run west of Menin, northwards to Passchendaele. Between the German defences lay villages such as Zonnebeke and Passchendaele, which were fortified and prepared for all-round defence.

On 30 June, the army group Chief of Staff, General von Kuhl, suggested a withdrawal to the  along Passchendaele ridge, meeting the old front line in the north near Langemarck and Armentières in the south. Such a withdrawal would avoid a hasty retreat from Pilckem Ridge and force the British into a time-consuming redeployment. Pilckem Ridge deprived the British of ground observation over the Steenbeek Valley, while the Germans could see the area from Passchendaele Ridge, allowing German infantry to be supported by observed artillery-fire. Loßberg's judgement was accepted and no withdrawal was made.

Battle of Messines

The first stage in the British plan was a preparatory attack on the German positions south of Ypres at Messines Ridge. The Germans on the ridge had observation over Ypres and unless it was captured, observed enfilade artillery-fire could be fired against a British attack from the salient further north. The Germans knew the British were mining and had taken counter-measures but they were surprised at the extent of the British effort. The final objectives were largely gained before dark and the British had fewer losses than the expected  the initial attack. As the infantry advanced over the far edge of the ridge, German artillery and machine-guns east of the ridge opened fire and the British artillery was less able to suppress them. The attack removed the Germans from the dominating ground on the southern face of the Ypres salient, which the 4th Army had held since the First Battle of Ypres in 1914.

Battles

JulyAugust

Haig selected Gough to command the offensive on 30 April, and on 10 June Gough and the Fifth Army headquarters took over the Ypres salient north of Messines Ridge. Gough planned an offensive based on the GHQ 1917 plan and the instructions he had received from Haig. A fourth objective, the red line was also given for the first day, to be attempted by fresh troops, at the discretion of divisional and corps commanders, in places where the German defence had collapsed.

Major-General John Davidson, Director of Operations at GHQ, wrote in a memorandum that there was "ambiguity as to what was meant by a step-by-step attack with limited objectives" and suggested reverting to a  advance on the first day to increase the concentration of British artillery. Gough stressed the need to plan to exploit opportunities to take ground left temporarily undefended, more likely in the first attack, which would have the benefit of long preparation. This had not been done in earlier battles and vacant ground, there for the taking, had been re-occupied by the Germans. At the end of June, Haig added a division to II Corps (Lieutenant-General Claud Jacob) from the Second Army and next day, after meeting with Gough and General Herbert Plumer, the Second Army commander, Haig endorsed the Fifth Army plan.

Battle of Pilckem Ridge

The main attack, by II Corps across the Ghelveult Plateau to the south, confronted the principal German defensive concentration of artillery, ground-holding divisions and  divisions. The attack had most success on the northern flank, on the fronts of XIV Corps and the French First Army, both of which advanced  to the line of the Steenbeek river. Group Ypres counter-attacked the flanks of the British break-in, supported by every artillery piece and aircraft within range, around noon. The Germans were able to drive the three British brigades back to the black line with  casualties; the German advance was stopped at the black line by mud, artillery and machine-gun fire.

Capture of Westhoek

After rain delays from 2 August, II Corps attacked again on 10 August, to capture the rest of the black line (second objective) on the Gheluvelt plateau. The infantry advance succeeded but German artillery-fire and infantry counter-attacks isolated the infantry of the 18th (Eastern) Division in Glencorse Wood. At about  German infantry attacked behind a smokescreen and recaptured all but the north-west corner of the wood; only the 25th Division gains on Westhoek Ridge to the north were held.

Battle of Hill 70

Attacks to threaten Lens and Lille were to be made by the First Army in late June near Gavrelle and Oppy, along the Souchez river. The objective was to eliminate a German salient between Avion and the west end of Lens, by taking reservoir Hill (Hill 65) and Hill 70. The attacks were conducted earlier than planned to use heavy and siege artillery before it was transferred to Ypres, the Souchez operation being cut back and the attack on Hill 70 postponed. The Canadian Corps fought four divisions of the German 6th Army in the operation. The capture of Hill 70 was a costly success in which three Canadian divisions inflicted many casualties on the German divisions opposite and pinned down troops reserved for the relief of tired divisions in Flanders. Hermann von Kuhl, chief of staff of Army Group Crown Prince Rupprecht, wrote later that it was a costly defeat and wrecked the plan for relieving fought-out (exhausted) divisions in Flanders.

Battle of Langemarck

The Battle of Langemarck was fought from  the Fifth Army headquarters was influenced by the effect that delay would have on Operation Hush, which needed the high tides due at the end of August or it would have to be postponed for a month. In the II Corps area, the disappointment of 10 August was repeated, with the infantry managing to advance, then being isolated by German artillery and forced back to their start line by German counter-attacks, except in the 25th Division area near Westhoek. Attempts by the German infantry to advance further were stopped by British artillery-fire with many casualties.

Local attacks

On the higher ground, the Germans continued to inflict many losses on the British divisions beyond Langemarck but on 19 August, after two fine dry days, XVIII Corps conducted a novel infantry, tank, aircraft and artillery operation. On 22 August, more ground was gained by XIX and XVIII corps but the tactical disadvantage of being overlooked by the Germans continued. A II Corps attack on the Gheluvelt Plateau from 22 to 24 August, to capture Nonne Bosschen, Glencorse Wood and Inverness Copse, failed in fighting that was costly to both sides. Gough laid down a new infantry formation of skirmish lines to be followed by "worms" on 24 August and Cavan noted that pillboxes should be attacked on a broad front, to engage them simultaneously. Another general offensive intended for 25 August, was delayed by the failure of the preliminary attacks and then postponed due to more bad weather. On 27 August, II Corps tried a combined tank and infantry attack but the tanks bogged, the attack failed and Haig called a halt to operations until the weather improved.

Weather

In Field Marshal Earl Haig (1929), Brigadier-General John Charteris, the BEF Chief of Intelligence from 1915 to 1918, wrote that

only the first part of which was quoted by Lloyd George (1934), Liddell Hart (1934) and Leon Wolff (1959); in a 1997 essay, John Hussey called the passage by Charteris "baffling". The BEF had set up a Meteorological Section under Ernest Gold in 1915, which by the end of 1917 had  and  The section predicted the warm weather and thunderstorms of 7 to 14 June; in a letter to the press of 17 January 1958, Gold wrote that the facts of the Flanders climate contradicted Charteris. In 1989, Philip Griffiths examined August weather in Flanders for the thirty years before 1916 and found that,

Hussey wrote that the wet weather in August 1917 was exceptional, Haig had been justified in expecting little rain, swiftly dried by sunshine and breezes.

Verdun

Petain had committed the French Second Army to an attack at Verdun in mid-July, in support of the Flanders offensive. The attack was delayed, partly due to mutinies in the French army after the failure of the Nivelle Offensive and because of a German attack at Verdun from 28 to 29 June, which captured some of the French jumping-off points. A French counter-attack on 17 July re-captured the ground, the Germans regained it on 1 August, then took ground on the east bank on 16 August. The French attacked on 20 August and by 9 September had taken  Sporadic fighting continued into October, adding to the German difficulties on the Western Front and elsewhere. Ludendorff wrote

No German counter-attack was possible because the local  divisions had been transferred to Flanders.

September–October

The 4th Army had held on to the Gheluvelt Plateau in August but its casualties worsened the German manpower shortage. Haig transferred the main offensive effort to the Second Army on 25 August and moved the northern boundary of the Second Army closer to the Ypres–Roulers railway. More heavy artillery was sent to Flanders from the armies further south and placed opposite the Gheluvelt Plateau. Plumer continued the tactical evolution of the Fifth Army during its slow and costly progress in August. After a pause of about three weeks, Plumer intended to capture the plateau in four steps, with six-day intervals to bring forward artillery and supplies.

Plumer arranged for the medium and heavy artillery reinforcements reaching Flanders to be added to the creeping bombardment, which had been impossible with the amount of artillery available to the Fifth Army. The tactical changes ensured that more infantry attacked on narrower fronts, to a shallower depth than on 31 July, like the Fifth Army attacks in August. The shorter and quicker advances possible once the ground dried were intended to be consolidated on tactically advantageous ground, especially on any reverse slopes in the area, with the infantry still in contact with the artillery and aircraft, ready to repulse counter-attacks. The faster tempo of operations was intended to add to German difficulties in replacing tired divisions through the railway bottlenecks behind the German front.

German tactical changes

After the dry spell in early September, British advances had been much quicker and the final objective was reached a few hours after dawn, which confounded the German counter-attack divisions. Having crossed  of mud, the  divisions found the British already dug in, with the German forward battle zone and its weak garrison gone beyond recapture. In August, German front-line divisions had two regiments deployed in the front line, with the third regiment in reserve. The front battalions had needed to be relieved much more frequently than expected due to the power of British attacks, constant artillery-fire and the weather. Replacement units became mixed up with ones holding the front and reserve regiments had failed to intervene quickly, leaving front battalions unsupported until  divisions arrived some hours later.

In July and August, German counter-attack divisions had conducted an "advance to contact during mobile operations", which had given the Germans several costly defensive successes. After the Battle of the Menin Road Ridge, German tactics were changed. After another defeat on 26 September, the German commanders made more tactical changes to counter the more conservative form of limited attacks adopted by the British. German counter-attacks in September had been "assaults on reinforced field positions", due to the restrained nature of British infantry advances. The fine weather in early September had greatly eased British supply difficulties, especially in ammunition and the British made time to establish a defence in depth on captured ground, protected by standing artillery barrages. The British attacked in dry, clear conditions, with more aircraft over the battlefield for counter-attack reconnaissance, contact patrol and ground-attack operations. Systematic defensive artillery-fire was forfeited by the Germans, due to uncertainty over the position of their infantry, just when the British infantry benefited from the opposite. German counter-attacks were costly failures and on 28 September, Thaer wrote that the experience was "awful" and that he did not know what to do.

The other regiments of the  divisions were to be held back and used for a methodical counter-attack a day or two after and for spoiling attacks as the British reorganised. More tactical changes were ordered on 30 September; operations to increase British infantry losses were to continue and gas bombardments were to be increased, weather permitting. Every effort was to be made to induce the British to reinforce their forward positions with infantry for the German artillery to bombard them.

Battle of the Menin Road Ridge

The British plan for the battle fought from  included more emphasis on the use of heavy and medium artillery to destroy German concrete pill-boxes and machine-gun nests, which were more numerous in the battle zones being attacked, than behind the original July front line and to engage in more counter-battery fire. The British had  and medium and  guns and howitzers, more than double the quantity of artillery available at the Battle of Pilckem Ridge. Aircraft were to be used for systematic air observation of German troop movements, to avoid the failures of previous battles, where too few aircrews had been burdened with too many duties and had flown in bad weather, which made their difficulties worse.

The Germans made many hasty counter-attacks, beginning around  until early evening, all of which failed to gain ground or made only a temporary penetration of the new British positions. The German defence had failed to stop a well-prepared attack made in good weather. Minor attacks took place after 20 September, as both sides jockeyed for position and reorganised their defences. A mutually-costly attack by the Germans on 25 September, recaptured pillboxes at the south western end of Polygon Wood. Next day, the German positions near the wood were swept away in the Battle of Polygon Wood.

German counter-attack, 25 September

The infantry were supported by artillery-observation and ground-attack aircraft; a box-barrage was fired behind the British front-line, which isolated the British infantry from reinforcements and ammunition. Return-fire from the 33rd Division and the 15th Australian Brigade of the 5th Australian Division along the southern edge of Polygon Wood to the north, forced the attackers under cover around some of the  pillboxes, near Black Watch Corner, at the south-western edge of Polygon Wood. German attempts to reinforce the attacking troops failed, due to British artillery observers isolating the advanced German troops with artillery barrages.

Plumer ordered the attack due on 26 September to go ahead but reduced the objectives of the 33rd Division. The 98th Brigade was to advance and cover the right flank of the 5th Australian Division and the 100th Brigade was to re-capture the lost ground further south. The 5th Australian Division advance the next day began with uncertainty as to the security of its right flank; the attack of the depleted 98th Brigade was delayed and only managed to reach Black Watch Corner,  short of its objectives. Reinforcements moved into the 5th Australian Division area and attacked south-westwards at noon as a silent (without artillery support) frontal attack was made from Black Watch Corner, because British troops were known to be holding out in the area. Casualties in the 33rd Division were so great that it was relieved on 27 September by the 23rd Division, which had only been withdrawn on the night of

Battle of Polygon Wood

The Second Army altered its Corps frontages soon after the attack of 20 September, for the next effort  so that each attacking division could be concentrated on a  front. Roads and light railways were extended to the new front line, to allow artillery and ammunition to be moved forward. The artillery of VIII Corps and IX Corps on the southern flank, simulated preparations for attacks on Zandvoorde and Warneton. At  on 26 September, five layers of barrage fired by British artillery and machine-guns began. Dust and smoke thickened the morning mist and the infantry advanced using compass bearings. Each of the three German ground-holding divisions attacked on 26 September had an  division in support, twice the ratio of 20 September. No ground captured by the British was lost and German counter-attacks managed only to reach ground to which survivors of the front-line divisions had retired.

October–November

German counter-attacks, 30 September – 4 October

At  on 30 September, a thick mist covered the ground and at  German artillery began a bombardment between the Menin road and the Reutelbeek. At  German troops emerged from the mist on an  front. The attack was supported by flame-throwers and German infantry throwing smoke- and hand-grenades. The British replied with small-arms fire and bombs, forcing the Germans to retreat in confusion but a post was lost south of the Menin road, then retaken by an immediate counter-attack. SOS rockets were not seen in the mist and the British artillery remained silent. The Germans were repulsed again at  but German artillery-fire continued during the day.

On 1 October, at  a German hurricane bombardment began from the Reutelbeek north to Polygon Wood and Black Watch Corner; by coincidence a Second Army practice barrage began at  The British front line was cut off and German infantry attacked in three waves at  Two determined German attacks were repulsed south of Cameron Covert, then at  German troops massed near the Menin road. The German attack was defeated by small-arms fire and the British artillery, whose observers had seen the SOS rockets. The British were forced out of Cameron Covert and counter-attacked but a German attack began at the same time and the British were repulsed. Another German attack failed and the German troops dug in behind some old German barbed wire; after dark, more German attacks around Cameron Covert failed. North of the covert near Polygon Wood, deep mud smothered German shells before they exploded but they still caused many casualties. Communication with the rear was lost and the Germans attacked all day but British SOS rockets remained visible and the attacks took no ground; after dark German attacks were repulsed by another three SOS barrages.

The attacking infantry from the 45th Reserve and the 4th Guard divisions were commanded by Major Freiherr von Schleinitz in the north and Lieutenant-Colonel Rave in the south. After the costly failure of the methodical counter-attack on 1 October, the attack was put back to 4 October, rehearsals taking place from 2 to 3 October. A contact patrol aircraft was arranged to fly over the area at

Battle of Broodseinde

On 4 October, the British began the Battle of Broodseinde to complete the capture of the Gheluvelt Plateau and occupy Broodseinde Ridge. The British attacked along a  front and as the I Anzac Corps divisions began their advance towards Broodseinde Ridge, men were seen rising from shell-holes in no man's land and more German troops were found concealed in shell-craters. Most of the German troops of the 45th Reserve Division were overrun or retreated through the British barrage, then the Australians attacked pillboxes one-by-one and captured the village of Zonnebeke north of the ridge. When the British barrage began on Broodseinde Ridge, the Keiberg Spur and Waterdamhoek, some of the German forward headquarters staffs only realised that they were under attack when British and Australian troops appeared.

As news arrived of the great success of the attack, the head of GHQ Intelligence went to the Second Army headquarters to discuss exploitation. Plumer declined the suggestion, as eight fresh German divisions were behind the battlefield, with another six beyond them. Later in the day, Plumer had second thoughts and ordered I Anzac Corps to push on to the Keiberg spur, with support from the II Anzac Corps. The II Anzac Corps commander wanted to advance north-east towards Passchendaele village but the I Anzac Corps commander preferred to wait until artillery had been brought up and supply routes improved. The X Corps commander proposed an attack northward from In de Ster into the southern flank of the Germans opposite I Anzac Corps. The 7th Division commander objected, due to uncertainty about the situation and the many casualties suffered by the 21st Division on the right flank and Plumer changed his mind again. During the morning, Gough had told the Fifth Army corps commanders to push on but when reports arrived of a repulse at 19 Metre Hill, the order was cancelled.

German defensive changes

On 7 October, the 4th Army again dispersed its troops in the front defence zone. Reserve battalions moved back behind the artillery protective line and the  divisions were organised to intervene as swiftly as possible once an attack commenced, despite the risk of British artillery-fire. Counter-battery fire to suppress the British artillery was to be increased, to protect the  divisions as they advanced. All of the German divisions holding front zones were relieved and an extra division brought forward, because the British advances had lengthened the front line. Without the divisions necessary for a counter-offensive south of the Gheluvelt Plateau towards Kemmel Hill, Rupprecht began to plan for a slow withdrawal from the Ypres Salient, even at the risk of uncovering German positions further north and on the Belgian coast.

Battle of Poelcappelle

The French First Army and British Second and Fifth armies attacked on 9 October, on a  front, from south of Broodseinde to St Jansbeek, to advance half of the distance from Broodseinde ridge to Passchendaele, on the main front, which led to many casualties on both sides. Advances in the north of the attack front were retained by British and French troops but most of the ground taken in front of Passchendaele and on the Becelaere and Gheluvelt spurs was lost to German counter-attacks. General William Birdwood later wrote that the return of heavy rain and mud sloughs was the main cause of the failure to hold captured ground. Kuhl concluded that the fighting strained German fighting power to the limit but that the German forces managed to prevent a breakthrough, although it was becoming much harder to replace losses.

First Battle of Passchendaele

The First Battle of Passchendaele on 12 October was another Allied attempt to gain ground around Passchendaele. Heavy rain and mud again made movement difficult and little artillery could be brought closer to the front. Allied troops were exhausted and morale had fallen. After a modest British advance, German counter-attacks recovered most of the ground lost opposite Passchendaele, except for an area on the right of the Wallemolen spur. North of Poelcappelle, the XIV Corps of the Fifth Army advanced along the Broembeek some way up the Watervlietbeek and the Stadenrevebeek streams and the Guards Division captured the west end of the Vijwegen spur, gaining observation over the south end of Houthulst Forest. There were  casualties, including  Zealanders,  whom were dead or stranded in the mud of no-man's-land; it was one of the worst days in New Zealand military history.

At a conference on 13 October, Haig and the army commanders agreed that attacks would stop until the weather improved and roads could be extended, to carry more artillery and ammunition forward. The offensive was to continue, to reach a suitable line for the winter and to keep German attention on Flanders, with a French attack due on 23 October and the Third Army operation south of Arras scheduled for mid-November. The battle was also costly for the Germans, who lost more than  The German 195th Division at Passchendaele suffered  casualties from 9 to 12 October and had to be relieved by the 238th Division. Ludendorff became optimistic that Passchendaele Ridge could be held and ordered the 4th Army to stand fast. On 18 October, Kuhl advocated a retreat as far to the east as possible; Armin and Loßberg wanted to hold on, because the ground beyond the Passchendaele watershed was untenable, even in winter.

Action of 22 October 

On 22 October the 18th (Eastern) Division of XVIII Corps attacked the east end of Poelcappelle as XIV Corps to the north attacked with the 34th Division between the Watervlietbeek and Broenbeek streams and the 35th Division northwards into Houthulst Forest. The attack was supported by a regiment of the French 1st Division on the left flank of the 35th Division and was intended to obstruct a possible German counter-attack on the left flank of the Canadian Corps as it attacked Passchendaele and the ridge. The artillery of the Second and Fifth armies conducted a bombardment to simulate a general attack as a deception. Poelcappelle was captured but the attack at the junction between the 34th and 35th divisions was repulsed. German counter-attacks pushed back the 35th Division in the centre but the French attack captured all its objectives. Attacking on ground cut up by bombardments and soaked by rain, the British had struggled to advance in places and lost the ability to move quickly to outflank pillboxes. The 35th Division reached the fringe of Houthulst Forest but was outflanked and pushed back in places. German counter-attacks made after 22 October, were at an equal disadvantage and were costly failures. The German 4th Army was prevented from transferring troops away from the Fifth Army and from concentrating its artillery-fire on the Canadians as they prepared for the Second Battle of Passchendaele (26 October – 10 November 1917).

Battle of La Malmaison

After numerous requests from Haig, Petain began the Battle of La Malmaison, a long-delayed French attack on the Chemin des Dames, by the Sixth Army (General Paul Maistre). The Germans had to withdraw from their remaining positions on the Chemin des Dames to the north of the Ailette Valley early in November. Haig was pleased with the French success but regretted the delay, which had lessened its effect on the Flanders operations.

Second Battle of Passchendaele

The Canadians relieved the II Anzac Corps on 18 October and found that the front line was mostly the same as that occupied by the 1st Canadian Division in April 1915. The Canadian operation was to be three limited attacks, on 26 October 30 October and 6 November. On 26 October, the 3rd Canadian Division captured its objective at Wolf Copse, then swung back its northern flank to link with the adjacent division of the Fifth Army. The 4th Canadian Division captured its objectives but was forced slowly to retire from Decline Copse, against German counter-attacks and communication failures between the Canadian and Australian units to the south.

The second stage began on 30 October, to complete the previous stage and gain a base for the final assault on Passchendaele. The attackers on the southern flank quickly captured Crest Farm and sent patrols beyond the final objective into Passchendaele. The attack on the northern flank again met with exceptional German resistance. The 3rd Canadian Division captured Vapour Farm on the corps boundary, Furst Farm to the west of Meetcheele and the crossroads at Meetcheele but remained short of its objective. During a seven-day pause, the Second Army took over another section of the Fifth Army front adjoining the Canadian Corps. Three rainless days from  eased preparation for the next stage, which began on the morning of 6 November, with the 1st Canadian Division and the 2nd Canadian Division. In less than three hours, many units reached their final objectives and Passchendaele was captured. The Canadian Corps attacked on 10 November to gain control of the remaining high ground north of the village near

December

Night action of 1/2 December 1917

On 18 November the VIII Corps on the right and II Corps on the left (northern) side of the Passchendaele Salient took over from the Canadian Corps. The area was subjected to constant German artillery bombardments and its vulnerability to attack led to a suggestion by Brigadier C. F. Aspinall, that either the British should retire to the west side of the Gheluvelt Plateau or advance to broaden the salient towards Westroosebeke. Expanding the salient would make the troops in it less vulnerable to German artillery-fire and provide a better jumping off line for a resumption of the offensive in the spring of 1918. The British attacked towards Westroozebeke on the night of 1/2 December but the plan to mislead the Germans by not bombarding the German defences until eight minutes after the infantry began their advance came undone. The noise of the British assembly and the difficulty of moving across muddy and waterlogged ground had also alerted the Germans.

Action on the Polderhoek Spur

The attack on the Polderhoek Spur on 3 December 1917, was a local operation by the British Fourth Army (renamed from the Second Army on 8 November). Two battalions of the 2nd New Zealand Brigade of the New Zealand Division attacked the low ridge, from which German observers could view the area from Cameron Covert to the north and the Menin road to the south-west. Heavy artillery bombarded the ruins of Polderhoek Château and the pillboxes in the grounds to mislead the defenders and the attack was made in daylight as a ruse to surprise the Germans, who would be under cover sheltering from the routine bombardments. Smoke and gas bombardments on the Gheluvelt and Becelaere spurs on the flanks and the infantry attack began at the same time as the "routine" bombardment. The ruse failed, some British artillery-fire dropped short on the New Zealanders and the Germans engaged the attackers with small-arms fire from Polderhoek Spur and Gheluvelt ridge. A strong west wind ruined the smoke screens and the British artillery failed to suppress the German machine-guns. New Zealand machine-gunners repulsed a counter-attack but the New Zealand infantry were  short of the first objective; another attempt after dark was cancelled because of the full moon and the arrival of German reinforcements.

Aftermath

Analysis 

In a German General Staff publication, it was written that "Germany had been brought near to certain destruction by the Flanders battle of 1917". In his Memoirs of 1938, Lloyd George wrote, "Passchendaele was indeed one of the greatest disasters of the war ... No soldier of any intelligence now defends this senseless campaign ...". The German submarine bases on the coast had not been captured but the objective of diverting the Germans from the French further south, while they recovered from the Nivelle Offensive in April, had succeeded. In 1997, Paddy Griffith wrote that the bite and hold system kept moving until November, because the BEF had developed a workable system of offensive tactics, against which the Germans ultimately had no answer. A decade later, Jack Sheldon wrote that relative casualty figures were irrelevant, because the German army could not afford the losses or to lose the initiative by being compelled to fight another defensive battle on ground of the Allies' choosing. The Third Battle of Ypres had pinned the German army to Flanders and caused unsustainable casualties.

In 2018, Jonathan Boff wrote that after the war the  official historians, many of whom were former staff officers, wrote of the tactical changes after 26 September and their scrapping after the Battle of Broodseinde on 4 October, as the work of Loßberg. By blaming an individual, the rest of the German commanders were exculpated, which gave a false impression that OHL operated in a rational manner, when Ludendorff imposed another defensive scheme on 7 October. Boff wrote that this narrative was facile and that it avoided the problem faced by the Germans in late 1917. OHL had issued orders to change tactics again days before Loßberg was blamed for giving new orders to the 4th Army. Boff also doubted that all of the divisions in Flanders could act on top-down changes. The 119th Division was in the front line from 11 August to 18 October and replied that new tactics were difficult to implement due to lack of training. The tempo of British attacks and the effect of attrition meant that although six divisions were sent to the 4th Army by 10 October, they were either novice units deficient in training or veteran formations with low morale after earlier defeats; good divisions had been diluted with too many replacements. Boff wrote that the Germans consciously sought tactical changes for an operational dilemma for want of an alternative. On 2 October, Rupprecht had ordered the 4th Army HQ to avoid over-centralising command, only to find that Loßberg had issued an artillery plan detailing the deployment of individual batteries.

At a British conference on 13 October, the Third Army (General Julian Byng) scheme for an attack in mid-November was discussed. Byng wanted the operations at Ypres continued, to hold German troops in Flanders. The Battle of Cambrai began on 20 November and the British breached the first two parts of the Hindenburg Line, in the first successful mass use of tanks in a combined arms operation. The experience of the failure to contain the British attacks at Ypres and the drastic reduction in areas of the western front that could be considered "quiet" after the tank and artillery surprise at Cambrai, left the OHL with little choice but to return to a strategy of decisive victory in 1918. British and French troops were swiftly moved from  but the diversion of resources from the BEF forced Haig to conclude the Third Battle of Ypres short of Westrozebeke; the last substantial British attack took place on 10 November.

Casualties

Various casualty figures have been published for the Third Battle of Ypres, sometimes with acrimony; the highest estimates for British and German casualties appear to be discredited but the British claim to have taken  has not been disputed. In 1940, C. R. M. F. Cruttwell recorded  casualties and  In the History of the Great War volume Military Operations.... published in 1948, James Edmonds put British casualties  and wrote that equivalent German figures were not available, estimating German losses  A. J. P. Taylor wrote in 1972 that no one believed Edmonds' "farcical calculations". Taylor put British wounded and killed at  German losses at  "a proportion slightly better than the Somme".

Despite writing that  casualties was the BEF total for the second half of 1917, Wolff had neglected to deduct  for the Battle of Cambrai, given in the Official Statistics from which he quoted or "normal wastage", averaging  month in "quiet" periods. In 1959, Cyril Falls estimated   and  casualties. In his 1963 biography of Haig, Terraine accepted Edmonds' figure of  casualties and agreed that German losses were at least equal to and probably greater than British, owing to the strength of British artillery and the high number of German counterattacks; he did not accept Edmonds' calculation that German losses were as high  In his 1977 work, Terraine wrote that the German figure ought to be increased because their statistics were incomplete and because their data omitted some lightly wounded men, who would have been included under British casualty criteria, revising the German figure by twenty per cent, which made German casualties  Prior and Wilson, in 1997, gave British losses of  German casualties at just  In 1997, Heinz Hagenlücke gave  casualties. Gary Sheffield wrote in 2002 that Richard Holmes guessed that both sides suffered  which seemed about right to him.

Subsequent operations

Winter 1917–1918

The area to the east and south of the ruins of Passchendaele village was held by posts, those to the east being fairly habitable, unlike the southern ones; from Passchendaele as far back as Potijze, the ground was far worse. Each brigade spent four days in the front line, four in support and four in reserve. The area was quiet apart from artillery-fire and in December the weather turned cold and snowy, which entailed a great effort to prevent trench foot. In January, spells of freezing cold were followed by warmer periods, one beginning on 15 January with torrential rain and gale-force winds, washing away plank roads and duckboard tracks. Conditions in the salient improved with the completion of transport routes and the refurbishment of German pillboxes. Both sides raided and the British used night machine-gun fire and artillery barrages to great effect. On the evening of 3 March 1918, two companies of the 8th Division raided Teal Cottage, supported by a smoke and shrapnel barrage, killed many of the garrison and took six prisoners for one man wounded. A German attack on 11 March was repulsed; after that the Germans made no more attacks, keeping up frequent artillery bombardments and machine-gun fire instead. When the German armies further south began the Spring Offensive on 21 March 1918, "good" divisions in Flanders were sent south; the 29th Division was withdrawn on 9 April and transferred to the Lys.

Retreat, 1918

On 23 March, Haig ordered Plumer to make contingency plans to shorten the line and release troops for the other armies. Worn-out divisions from the south had been sent to Flanders to recuperate closer to the coast. On 11 April, Plumer authorised a withdrawal of the southern flank of the Second Army. On 12 April, the VIII Corps HQ ordered the infantry retirement to begin that night and the 59th Division was replaced by part of the 41st Division and transferred south. The II Corps had begun to withdraw its artillery at the same time as VIII Corps, on the night of 11/12 April and ordered the 36th (Ulster) and 30th divisions to conform to the VIII Corps retirement, which was complete by 13 April, with no German interference. On 13 April, Plumer agreed to a retirement in the south side of the salient to a line from Mt Kemmel to Voormezeele [ south of Ypres], White Château [ east of Ypres] and Pilckem Ridge. The 4th Army diary recorded that the withdrawal was discovered at  Next day, at the Battle of Merckem, the Germans attacked from Houthulst Forest, north-east of Ypres and captured Kippe but were forced out by Belgian counter-attacks, supported by the II Corps artillery. On the afternoon of 27 April, the south end of the Second Army outpost line was driven in near Voormezeele and another British outpost line was established north-east of the village.

Commemoration

The Menin Gate Memorial to the Missing commemorates those of all Commonwealth nations (except New Zealand and Newfoundland) who died in the Ypres Salient and have no known grave. In the case of the United Kingdom only casualties before 16 August 1917 are commemorated on the memorial. United Kingdom and New Zealand servicemen who died after that date are named on the memorial at Tyne Cot Cemetery. There is a New Zealand Memorial marking where New Zealand troops fought at Gravenstafel Ridge on 4 October, located on Roeselarestraat. There are numerous tributes and memorials in Australia and New Zealand to Anzac soldiers who died in the battle, including plaques at the Christchurch and Dunedin railway stations. The Canadian Corps' participation in the Second Battle of Passchendaele is commemorated with the Passchendaele Memorial at site of the Crest Farm on the south-west fringe of Passchendaele village.

One of the newest monuments to be dedicated to the fighting contribution of a group is the Celtic Cross memorial, commemorating the Scottish contribution to the fighting in Flanders during the Great War. This memorial is on Frezenberg Ridge where the 9th (Scottish) Division and the 15th (Scottish) Division fought during the Third Battle of Ypres. The monument was dedicated by Linda Fabiani, the Minister for Europe of the Scottish Parliament, during the late summer of 2007, the 90th anniversary of the battle. In July 2017 a two-day event was organised in Ypres to mark the centenary of the battle. Members of the British royal family and Prime Minister Theresa May joined the ceremonies, which started in the evening of 30 July with the service at Menin Gate, followed by ceremonies at the Market Square. On the following day, a ceremony was held at Tyne Cot cemetery, headed by the Prince of Wales.

See also

 Passchendaele, a 2008 Canadian film with the battle as a backdrop.

Notes

Footnotes

References

Books
 
 
 
 
 
 
 
 
 
 
 
 
 
 
 
 
 
 
 
 
 
 
 
 
 
 
 
 
 
 
 
 
 
 
 
 
 
 
 
 
 
 
 
 
 
 
 
 
 
 
 

Journals
 

Newspapers
 
 

Theses
  
  
  

Websites

Further reading

External links

 Passchendaele – Canada's Other Vimy Ridge, Norman Leach, Canadian Military Journal
 Passchendaele, original reports from The Times
 Battles: The Third Battle of Ypres, 1917

 
Conflicts in 1917
1917 in Belgium
Battles of World War I involving Australia
Battles of World War I involving Belgium
Battles of World War I involving Canada
Battles of World War I involving France
Battles of World War I involving Germany
Battles of World War I involving New Zealand
Battles of World War I involving South Africa
Battles of World War I involving the United Kingdom
Battles of the Western Front (World War I)
Battle honours of the Rifle Brigade
Events of National Historic Significance (Canada)